Kitty is a 1945 film, a costume drama set in London during the 1780s, directed by Mitchell Leisen, based on the novel of the same name by Rosamond Marshall (published in 1943), with a screenplay by Karl Tunberg. It stars Paulette Goddard, Ray Milland, Constance Collier, Patric Knowles, Reginald Owen, and Cecil Kellaway as the English painter Thomas Gainsborough. In a broad interpretation of George Bernard Shaw's Pygmalion, the film tells the rags-to-riches story of a beautiful young cockney guttersnipe who is given a complete makeover by an impoverished aristocrat (Milland) and his aunt (Collier) in hopes of arranging her marriage to a peer, thereby repairing their fortunes and their social status.

Plot
In 1783 London, a poor thief, Kitty, is caught picking the pocket of painter Thomas Gainsborough. Amused, he pays her to sit for a portrait. While posing, she attracts the attention of Sir Hugh Marcy, who offers her a job as a scullery maid and (later) his aunt's ward. Kitty later learns he is impoverished, having lost his post in the Foreign Office. All the while, Gainsborough's portrait of Kitty, The Anonymous Lady, creates a stir, as people try to guess the subject's identity. The Duke of Malmunster, who buys the painting, asks Gainsborough about the model. Sir Hugh interjects that she is his aunt's ward. So in exchange for an introduction to Kitty, the Duke offers to have Hugh reinstated in the Foreign Office. But the relationship goes no further than the promised introduction. Meanwhile, Kitty develops an attraction for Hugh—so much so, that when he is sent to debtors' prison, Kitty charms wealthy industrialist Jonathan Selby into marriage, using her dowry to free Hugh. But he and his aunt once again go broke. So when Kitty breaks into her husband's strongbox to bail them out of trouble, Selby beats her but then dies at the hands of Kitty's loyal maid.

As a result, Kitty inherits a large fortune. She desires happiness with Hugh, but he is determined instead that she marry the Duke of Malmunster and reclaim his career. Kitty gives in, and after the honeymoon, the duke makes it known that Kitty is pregnant (though the father is actually the late Selby). After the birth of the boy, the old duke dies, leaving Kitty extremely wealthy. After a respectable mourning period, Hugh attempts to arrange a third marriage for Kitty, this time to the Prince of Wales. Kitty, however, confesses to Hugh she married twice out of love for him. Unimpressed, Hugh replies that he considers their relationship a business arrangement, nothing more. Meanwhile, Kitty becomes engaged to Hugh's close friend, the Earl of Carstairs. Seeing them together, Hugh realizes he actually is in love with Kitty. The Earl, ever the gentleman, chooses not to stand in the way of Hugh's happiness. So in the end, Hugh and Kitty are free to affirm their mutual devotion.

Cast
Paulette Goddard as Kitty. To acquire a Cockney accent, Goddard shared a room for a time with the mother of actress Ida Lupino, who had  a very pronounced one. She learned upper-class diction from Constance Collier. Upon seeing this film, the director Jean Renoir decided to cast Goddard in his film The Diary of a Chambermaid.
Ray Milland as Sir Hugh Marcy
Patric Knowles as Brett, Earl of Carstairs
Reginald Owen as Duke of Malmunster
Cecil Kellaway as Thomas Gainsborough
Constance Collier as Lady Susan Dowitt, Sir Hugh's aunt
Dennis Hoey as Jonathan Selby
Sara Allgood as Old Meg, the head of the thieving band to which Kitty belongs at the beginning
Eric Blore as Dobson, Sir Hugh's servant
Gordon Richards as Sir Joshua Reynolds
Michael Dyne as H. R. H. The Prince of Wales
Edgar Norton as Earl of Campton
Patricia Cameron as Elaine Carlisle
Percival Vivian as Dr. Holt
Mary Gordon as Nanny
Anita Sharp-Bolster as Mullens (credited as Anita Bolster) 
Heather Wilde as Lil
Charles Coleman as Majordomo
Mae Clarke as Molly
Al Ferguson as Footman (uncredited)
Gibson Gowland as Prison Guard (uncredited)
Douglas Walton as Philip (uncredited)

Production
The film was based on a novel by Rosamond Marshall. Film rights were bought by Paramount prior to the novel's publication for a reported $50,000.

In October 1943, Paramount announced they would make the film with Paulette Goddard and Ray Milland, with Karl Turnberg and Darrell Ware to write and produce. The novel was published that month. The New York Times described the released film as being "robust entertainment". By January 1946, the book had sold almost 900,000 copies.

In the original novel, Kitty was a prostitute. The Breen Office, who handled censorship at the time, ruled if this was to be kept in the film version, Kitty would have to die at the end for punishment. The story was changed so Kitty was a pickpocket.

In March 1944, Mitchell Leisen was announced as the director and Cecil Kellaway was cast as Gainsborough.

Director Leisen worked very hard with the set and costume designers to create a historically correct picture of 18th-century England. The California portrait painter Theodore Lukits served as technical adviser for the film's artistic scenes and painted the portrait of Kitty that is seen in the film. Lukits knew Ray Milland because he had painted his wife's portrait in 1942.

Goddard was coached in her cockney accent by Connie Lupino, mother of Ida Lupino.

In May 1944, before filming began, Goddard signed a new contract with Paramount to make two films a year over seven years.

Filming started in May 1944. Leisen reportedly spent over $25,000 on recreations of Gainsborough portraits. Goddard made the film after returning from entertaining the troops in India and Burma. Milland made it immediately prior to The Lost Weekend.

The ending of the film was re-shot in December 1944.

Reception

Box office
The film earned over $3 million at the North American box office.

Awards
The film was nominated for one Oscar for Best Art Direction-Interior Decoration, Black-and-White (Hans Dreier, Walter H. Tyler, Samuel M. Comer, Ray Moyer).

Radio adaptation
Kitty was presented on Hollywood Players on CBS November 5, 1946. The adaptation starred Paulette Goddard.

References

External links

 theodorelukits.org

1945 films
1945 romantic drama films
1940s historical romance films
American historical drama films
American romantic drama films
American black-and-white films
Cultural depictions of George IV
Films scored by Victor Young
Films based on American novels
Films based on romance novels
Films directed by Mitchell Leisen
Films set in 1783
Films set in London
Paramount Pictures films
Thomas Gainsborough
1940s historical drama films
American historical romance films
1940s American films